Highway 16 is a highway in British Columbia, Canada. It is an important section of the Yellowhead Highway, a part of the Trans-Canada Highway that runs across Western Canada. The highway closely follows the path of the northern B.C. alignment of the Canadian National Railway. The number "16" was first given to the highway in 1941, and originally, the route that the highway took was more to the north of today's highway, and it was not as long as it is now. Highway 16 originally ran from New Hazelton east to Aleza Lake. In 1947, Highway 16's western end was moved from New Hazelton to the coastal city of Prince Rupert, and in 1953, the highway was re-aligned to end at Prince George. In 1969, further alignment east into Yellowhead Pass was opened to traffic after being constructed up through 1968 and raised to all-weather standards in 1969. Highway 16's alignment on Haida Gwaii was commissioned in 1983 and is connected to the mainland segment via BC Ferries route #11.

A series of murders and disappearances has given the stretch between Prince Rupert and Prince George the name Highway of Tears.

Route description

Haida Gwaii section 

The  segment of the  BC highway begins in the west in the village of Masset, on the northern coast of Graham Island. Proceeding south, the highway goes  to the inlet town of Port Clements. Winding its way along the boundary of Naikoon Provincial Park, Highway 16 goes south for  before reaching the community of Tlell.  south of Tlell, Highway 16 reaches Skidegate, where its Haida Gwaii section terminates.

Mainland section 
BC Ferries then takes Highway 16 across the Hecate Strait for  due northeast to its landing at Prince Rupert.

From Prince Rupert, Highway 16 begins its winding route east through the Coast Mountain Ranges. Highway 37 merges onto Highway 16 from north of Highway 16, at the Kitwanga junction.

 east of Prince George, Highway 16 reaches the community of Dome Creek, where it converges with the Fraser River and turns southeast.

Highway of Tears

The Highway of Tears is a stretch of Highway 16  between Prince George and Prince Rupert. Since 1970, numerous women have gone missing or have been murdered along the  section of highway. Aboriginal organizations speculate that number ranges above forty. 

In 2016, the Canadian government launched the National Inquiry into Missing and Murdered Indigenous Women after communicating with victim families. This was done to find methods of slowing the violence within the Indigenous population.

In September 2020 a totem pole honouring missing and murdered Indigenous women was raised on the highway just outside Terrace.

Major intersections 
From west to east, the following intersections are observed along Highway 16.  Distances exclude the  ferry between Skidegate and Prince Rupert.

References

External links

Official Numbered Routes in British Columbia
Travel BC Yellowhead Highway information.
Call for RCMP action on highway of tears

!colspan=3| Yellowhead Highway
|-
|width="30%" style="text-align: center;"|Previous province:Terminus
|width="30%" style="text-align: center;"|BritishColumbia
|width="30%" style="text-align: center;"|Next province:Alberta

016
Highway of Tears
British Columbia 016
British Columbia 16
016
016
016